Hanazono Room, officially No. 136 Hanazono Room, is an apartment room with an indoor swimming pool located in the uppermost floor of the Sun Mall Crest Condominium in Shinjuku district in Tokyo, Japan. Operated by P-Studio, the indoor swimming pool in the apartment unit was a venue for many Japanese pornographic skits with themes of swimming and poolside intercourse. With its association with Japanese pornography, the indoor pool inside Hanazono Room became popularly known as That Pool in internet subculture.

Location 
The address of the Sun Mall Crest where the Hanazono Room was located is in Hanazonodori Road, 1-19-10 Shinjuku District, Tokyo. On the front of it was the Hanazono Elementary School. It was accessible from Shinjuku-gyoemmae Station where the Tokyo Metro Marunouchi Line runs through.

History of "That Pool" 
Although the Sun Mall Crest multipurpose condominium building was built and completed in 1988 in Shinjuku District of Tokyo, the No. 136 Hanazono Room including its soon-to-be-popular indoor leisure pool was actually built sometime before or after the year 2000 when Japan was recovering from the effects of the real estate disaster of the 1990s decade. It became an apartment unit for actor Kouji Ishizaka although he claimed that he lived just a floor below and the room actually belonged to another actor Kon Ichikawa, both of whom have since long moved out of their units, after which P-Studio acquired the room and started renting it out to studio firms nearby. Due to its proximity to Japanese gravure and pornographic studio companies and owing to their smaller budget resulting in limited choices for shooting locations, beginning in 2004 and by the mid and late 2000s the indoor pool at Hanazono Room became frequently used as background for swimsuit modeling photo shoots and low-budget pornographic films.

With images of the swimming pool of the Hanazono Room captured from pornographic films circulating in local Japanese internet community by late 2000s, it began being referred to as "That Pool" and "The Pool" among Japanese internet circles, most especially in 2ch and Niconico. Not long after, news outlets also began referring to the indoor pool as "That Pool". As names of the indoor pool became popular on the local media, the P-Studio which operates it eventually adapted the name "Example Pool". At some time during 2011, several segments from the tokusatsu drama Kamen Rider Fourze also featured the indoor pool, resulting in the pool garnering even more fame in media. With the massive spread of Japanese pornographic films on the internet around early 2010s onward, including the swimming-themed poolside pornographic films that were shot on the pool, "That Room" finally earned a global following and eventually became a well-known internet meme and gag as segments of the global internet community gradually familiarized the unique design of its surroundings in relation to its cult-like status on the web, specifically regarding the Japanese pornography industry.

After almost two decades of pornographic media usage, on August 11, 2020, pornographic studio companies finally stopped using the Hanazono Room indoor pool as they deemed it "virtually prohibited" for adult video shoots. This was after P-Studio announced that they would drastically increase the operating and maintenance fee on the pool due to the need to disinfect it of "bodily fluids" resulting from pornographic shoots inside, meaning that pornographic studio companies could no longer keep up with the operating expenses in shooting their films. However, the indoor pool is still being used for gravure modelling photo shoots and promotional trailers of pornographic films not otherwise taking place in the pool.

See also  
Pornography in Japan
Chronology of adult videos in Japan

References

Hospitality companies established in 1988
Hospitality companies of Japan
Individual rooms
Japanese brands
Service companies based in Tokyo
Japanese companies established in 1988